Senator Little may refer to:

Betty Little (born 1940), New York State Senate
Brad Little (born 1954), Idaho State Senate
Francis Little (American politician) (1822–1890), Wisconsin State Senate
Matt Little (born 1984), Minnesota State Senate
Russell M. Little (1809–1891), New York State Senate
T. D. Little (born 1942), Alabama State Senate
Zeb Little (born 1968), Alabama State Senate

See also
Senator Littell (disambiguation)